Portland Island, also called Waikawa, is a small island off the southern tip of the Māhia Peninsula on the North Island of New Zealand. It is used for sheep farming.

The area of the island fluctuates rapidly between high and low tides due to a shelf of rocks surrounding the east, north and west coast of the island. During low tide the area of the island can grow up to 3 km2, while during high tide it shrinks down to only 1.4 km2. This makes access by boat to the island rather difficult, despite it being only a kilometer offshore.

See also

 Lists of islands
 List of islands of New Zealand
 Desert island

References

Landforms of the Hawke's Bay Region
Uninhabited islands of New Zealand
Māhia Peninsula